Claire Askew (born 10 March 1986) is a Scottish novelist and poet.

The first book in her crime fiction series, which follows the work of DI Helen Birch, All the Hidden Truths, won the inaugural Bloody Scotland Scottish Crime Debut of the Year in 2019. In addition, the book was the winner of the 2016 Lucy Cavendish Fiction Prize, shortlisted for the Crime Writers Association Gold Dagger and Debut Dagger awards, and longlisted for the 2014 Peggy Chapman-Andrews (Bridport) Novel Award. She has subsequently published What You Pay For and Cover Your Tracks with Hodder & Stoughton. In 2020 she is also publishing Novelista, a writing guide.

Askew has also published three collections of poetry, The Mermaid and The Sailors(Red Squirrel Press, 2011), which won the 2010 Virginia Warbey Poetry Prize,  This changes things (Bloodaxe, 2016) and How to burn a woman (Bloodaxe, 2021). This changes things was shortlisted for the Saltire First Book Award, the Seamus Heaney Centre Poetry Prize, and the Michael Murphy Memorial Award.

Biography 
Claire Askew was born on 10 March 1986. She attended the University of Edinburgh, completing her undergraduate degree, postgraduate degree, and her PhD, before taking on the role as Writer in Residence at the institution. In 2017 her first two novels were bought by Hodder & Stoughton, with the first, All The Hidden Truths, being released in 2018.  Her latest book “How to Burn a Woman” is a collection of poems featuring outcast women through history, including witches, which Askew herself identifies as.

Publications

Fiction 

 All The Hidden Truths, Hodder & Stoughton - 2018
 What You Pay For, Hodder & Stoughton - 2019
 Cover Your Tracks, Hodder & Stoughton - 2020

Poetry 
The Mermaid and The Sailors, Red Squirral Press - 2011
This Changes Things, Bloodaxe - 2016
How to Burn a Woman, Bloodaxe - 2021

Non-fiction 
Novelista, John Murray Press - 2020

Awards

Fiction 
All The Hidden Truths

Winner

 Bloody Scotland Scottish Crime Debut of the year - 2019.
 Lucy Cavendish Fiction Prize - 2016.

Shortlisted

 Crime Writers Association Gold Dagger - 2019.
 Crime Writers Association John Creasy Debut Dagger award - 2019.

Longlisted

 Peggy Chapman-Andrews (Bridport) Novel Award - 2014.

What You Pay For

 Crime Writers Association Gold Dagger - 2020.

Poetry 
Winner

 Virginia Warbey Poetry Prize - 2010.
 International Salt Prize for Poetry - 2012.

Shortlisted

 Edwin Morgan Poetry Award - 2014 and 2016.

This Changes Things

Shortlisted

 Saltire First Book Award - 
 The Seamus Heaney Centre Poetry Prize.
 The Michael Murphy Memorial Award.

References 

Scottish crime fiction writers
Scottish women poets
Alumni of the University of Edinburgh
1986 births
Living people
Women crime fiction writers
21st-century Scottish women writers